"Truly, Truly True" is a song written by Dalibor Basler, Vladimir Rohlena, Al Stillman, and Arthur Altman and performed by Brenda Lee.  The song reached #9 on the adult contemporary chart and #54 on the Billboard Hot 100 in 1965.  It was featured on her 1965 album, The Versatile Brenda Lee.

The song was arranged by Owen Bradley.

References

1965 songs
1965 singles
Brenda Lee songs
Decca Records singles
Songs with lyrics by Al Stillman
Songs with music by Arthur Altman